The Han-Lai New World Center is a skyscraper located in Cianjin District, Kaohsiung, Taiwan. It is the eleventh tallest building in Taiwan and the third tallest in Kaohsiung (after 85 Sky Tower and Chang-Gu World Trade Center). The height of the building is 186 m, the floor area is 146,708.01m2, and it comprises 42 floors above ground, as well as 7 basement levels. Occupants include Hanshin Department Store and the Grand Hi-Lai Hotel.

See also 
 List of tallest buildings in Taiwan

References

1995 establishments in Taiwan
Buildings and structures completed in 1995
Skyscraper hotels in Kaohsiung
Hotel buildings completed in 1995